Jazbaat is a 1994 Bollywood romantic film directed by Anant Balani and written by Sutanu Gupta. Starring Suchitra Krishnamoorthi, Rohit Roy, Reema Lagoo, Mohnish Bahl and Kiran Kumar, it premiered on 8 July 1994 in Mumbai.

Cast
Suchitra Krishnamoorthi as Varsha
Rohit Roy as Vishal Shashtri
Reema Lagoo as Nirmala
Mohnish Bahl as Inspector Khan
Kiran Kumar as Balraj Shashtri, Vishal's father
Raj Kiran as Inder 
Deepak Shirke as Surma
Makrand Deshpande as Babban
Ashutosh Gowarikar as Kishen
Neena Gupta as Maya
Vikram Gokhale as Jagdish 
Pradeep Singh Rawat as Inspector Agnihotri
Anjan Srivastav as Father of Varsha
Suchitra Bandekar as Employee of Jagdish

Songs
"Dil Udta Hai Kya Kahta Hai" - Sameer Date, Asha Bhosle
"Ek Tu Hasin" - Asha Bhosle, Sameer Date
"Har Kisi Ko" - Alisha Chinai
"Khushiya Manane Ki Raat" - Asha Bhosle
"Lage Ladkiyo Ke Mamle Me" - Sapna Mukherjee

External links
 

1994 films
1990s Hindi-language films
1990s romance films
Films scored by Raamlaxman
Films directed by Anant Balani